The 1883 Upper Hunter colonial by-election was held on 6 March 1883 for the New South Wales Legislative Assembly electorate of Upper Hunter because of the resignation of John McElhone after a heated argument with the member for Mudgee Adolphus Taylor in which McElhone challenged Taylor to resign and both would contest Taylor's seat. The Newcastle Morning Herald and Miners' Advocate reported that despite McElhone saying he would not stand for Upper Hunter, he had been nominated without his authority.

Dates

Results

John McElhone resigned to challenge Adolphus Taylor for his seat of Mudgee. McElhoneJohn McElhone was defeated at the by-election for Mudgee which was conducted on the same day.

See also
Electoral results for the district of Upper Hunter
List of New South Wales state by-elections

References

Upper Hunter
New South Wales state by-elections
1880s in New South Wales